Jiaozuo (postal: Tsiaotso) is a prefecture-level city in the northwest of Henan province, China. Sitting on the northern bank of the Yellow River, it borders the provincial capital of Zhengzhou to the south, Xinxiang to the east, Jiyuan to the west, Luoyang to the southwest, and the province of Shanxi to the north. Jiaozuo is one of the core cities of the Central Plains urban agglomeration and a regional central city along the Shanxi–Henan border area.

Its population was 3,590,700 as of the 2018 estimate whom 1,424,500 lived in the built-up area made of 4 urban districts (Jiefang, Shanyang, Zhongzhan and Macun) and Bo'ai County largely being urbanized.

Administration
The prefecture-level city of Jiaozuo administers 4 districts, 2 county-level cities and 4 counties.

Jiefang District
Shanyang District
Zhongzhan District
Macun District
Qinyang City
Mengzhou City
Xiuwu County
Wuzhi County
Wen County
Bo'ai County

History

The city was founded on an industrial site left by the British after the First and Second Opium Wars (18391860). Jiaozuo was established as a city in 1953. Mao Zedong has written praise about the hard work of people from Jiaozuo in the coal industry.

In 1913, Hanoi County was renamed Qinyang County. In 1927, the eastern part of Qinyang County was set up as Boai County. After the outbreak of the Anti-Japanese War, in 1943, Meng County Party Committee, QinWenmeng Trilateral Working Committee, Jiyuan County Party Committee, Wangwu County Party Committee and so on belonged to the fourth Special office of Taiyue District. Jiaozuo City was established on September 8, 1945, under the eighth Special Office of Taihang District, which was changed to the fourth Special office in November, with jurisdiction over Jiaozuo and Wen County, Xiuwu County, Wuzhi County, Boai County, etc. In March 1948, Jiaozuo City was abolished and changed into Jiaozuo County.

On October 15, 1949, Jiaozuo mining area was changed and put under the leadership of the Office of Administrative Commissioner of Xinxiang County, Pingyuan Province. On November 15, 1952, Pingyuan Province was abolished and Jiaozuo Mining area was put under the leadership of Administrative Commissioner Office of Xinxiang, Henan Province. On July 9, 1956, it was renamed Jiaozuo City under the direct leadership of Henan Province. On December 1, 1959, Xiuwu and Boai counties were assigned to the leadership of Jiaozuo City. On August 15, 1960, Xiuwu and Boai counties were abolished and merged into Jiaozuo City. Revoking the establishment of Wen County and merging it into Qinyang County. October 5, 1961, the restoration of Xiuwu, Bo Ai, Wen County, under the leadership of the Office of Xinxiang Administrative Commissioner. January 19, 1974, Jiaozuo City belongs to the dual leadership of Henan Province and Xinxiang region. In March 1982, Jiaozuo City became a city under the jurisdiction of the provincial government. On September 1, 1983, Xiuwu and Boai counties were assigned to the leadership of Jiaozuo City. In January 1986, Wen County, Wuzhi, Meng County, Jiyuan, Qinyang five counties were assigned to the leadership of Jiaozuo City. In 1988, Jiyuan County was changed into Jiyuan City. In 1989, Qinyang County was changed into Qinyang City. In June 1996, Meng County was changed into Meng City. In 1997, Jiyuan City came under the direct administration of Henan Province.

In March 2010, Jiaozuo New District was established (in March 2014, it was renamed Jiaozuo Urban and Rural Integration Demonstration Zone); To the end of 2019, Jiaozuo City has jurisdiction over Qinyang City, Mengzhou City 2 cities, Boai County, Wuzhi County, Xiuwu County, Wen County 4 counties, Jiefang District, Shanyang District, Zhongzhan District, Ma Cun District 4 districts and Jiaozuo City urban-rural integration demonstration zone.

Climate
Jiaozuo has a temperate semi-arid climate (Köppen BSk) with four distinct seasons; owing to the shielding influence of the Taihang Mountains, temperatures in the urban core of Jiaozuo are warmer than in Xinxiang and Zhengzhou. Winters are cool and relatively dry while summers are hot and often rainy. Precipitation averages  annually.

Economy
In 2020, the GDP of Jiaozuo City reached 212.4 billion yuan, and the general public budget revenue exceeded 15 billion yuan.

In 2019, the city's GDP reached 276.11 billion yuan, an increase of 8.0% over the previous year. Specifically, the value added of the primary industry was 14.98 billion yuan, up by 4.2%; The added value of the secondary industry was 148.02 billion yuan, up by 8.7%; The value added of the tertiary industry was 113.12 billion yuan, up by 7.5%. Per capita GDP was 76,827 yuan. The structure of the tertiary industry changed from 5.5:53.9:40.6 in the previous year to 5.4:53.6:41.0, and the proportion of tertiary industry increased by 0.4 percentage points over the previous year.

The consumer price index rose by 3.0 percent over the previous year, including 6.8 percent for food, tobacco and alcohol, 3.3 percent for clothing, 1.6 percent for housing, 1.7 percent for retail commodities, and 2.9 percent for agricultural means of production.

The city's general public budget revenue was 15.647 billion yuan, an increase of 7.5% over the previous year, of which the tax revenue was 10.959 billion yuan, an increase of 7.2%, accounting for 70.0% of the general public budget revenue. Expenditure in the general public budget is 29.760 billion yuan, up 10.6%, of which expenditure on general public services is up 17.2%, expenditure on public security is up 3.4%, expenditure on social security and employment is up 7.6%, and expenditure on urban and rural communities is up 58.4%.

People 
By the end of 2019, the total population of the city was 3.7789 million, and the permanent population was 3.5971 million. The birth rate is 10.57 ‰, the mortality rate is 6.36 ‰, and the natural growth rate is 4.21 ‰. The urbanization rate reached 60.94%.

Transport
Zhengjiaojin Expressway, Xinjiaoji Expressway, Jiluo Expressway and Jiaowen Expressway pass through the territory. Local expressways are connected with national trunk expressways, realizing "county expressway", "township expressway" and "village expressway". [4] In October 2020, it will be included in the list of pilot areas for deepening the reform of rural road management and maintenance system. 

By the end of 2019, the expressway mileage was 239.51km. The annual highway cargo turnover was 30.25 billion tons per kilometer, up 9.4% over the previous year; Road passenger turnover reached 697 million person kilometers, down 11.8%.

Colleges and universities

Henan Polytechnic University (HPU), with a history of nearly 100 years, is the first mining university in Chinese history. Its former is Jiaozuo Coal Mining School which was established by the British Syndicate Co. Ltd., in 1909. It has changed its names several times in the course of development, namely, FuZhong Coal Mining University, Jiaozuo Private Institute of Technology, North-west Institute of Technology, Jiaozuo National Institute of Technology, Jiaozuo Mining Institute and Jiaozuo Institute of Technology. The University resumed its name of Henan Polytechnic University in 2004.
Henan University of Science and Technology  (Province-Building Universities, Central and Western Universities Infrastructure Capacity Building Engineering Universities)

Natural Scenery
Jiaozuo is located adjacent to the Yellow River and is just south of the Taihang Mountain.

In the southern foothills of the Taihang Mountains in the northern part of Jiaozuo, there are about 500 square miles of gravel slopes. The geology is hard and stable, and the strata have great endurance. It is also close to mines, water sources, traffic arteries and cities and towns. It is an ideal industrial land. Very suitable for the construction of high-rise buildings.

In Shanyang distinct, Fengshanzhen mountain is a leisure and entertainment place for people living around it.

Yuntai Mountain, Qing Tian River, Qing Long Cape, Shen Nong Mountain, Feng Lin Cape, and so on.

Yuntai Mountain is said to have the waterfall with main cascade of 314 meters in height, together with numerous smaller cascades.

On February 13, 2004, Yuntai Mountain as the fifth in the world, the third in the country China, was named the world's first World Geopark by UNESCO and caused attention at home and abroad. Meanwhile, Yuntaishan is also a national scenic spot, National Civilized Scenic Area, the first national AAAAA-level scenic spot, national natural heritage, national forest parks, national macaque nature reserve. Yuntain Mountain also has Asia's highest head drop waterfall.

Other landmarks
Amongst Jiaozuo's best sights are: 
 Old city with tombs
 Old rocks-hanging Taiping temple with cave grottoes
 Giant red new Jiaozuo temple
 TV tower
 Large futuristic Jiaozuo Sport centre
 Renmin bridge
 Building of People's government
 City's tallest building

Notable Person 
 Chen Wangting, founder of Chen-style taijiquan，
Li Shangyin,poets of the Tang Dynasty
Si Mayi,the founder of the Jin dynasty

References

External links

Government website of Jiaozuo (in Simplified Chinese)
Jiaozuo Travel Bureau (in English)

 
Cities in Henan
Prefecture-level divisions of Henan